Elections to the Baseball Hall of Fame for 1997 followed the system in use since 1995. The Baseball Writers' Association of America (BBWAA) voted by mail to select from recent major league players and elected Phil Niekro. The Veterans Committee met in closed sessions and selected three people from multiple classified ballots: Nellie Fox, Tommy Lasorda, and Willie Wells. A formal induction ceremony was held in Cooperstown, New York, on August 3, 1997.

The BBWAA election
The BBWAA was authorized to elect players active in 1977 or later, but not after 1991; the ballot included candidates from the 1996 ballot who received at least 5% of the vote but were not elected, along with selected players, chosen by a screening committee, whose last appearance was in 1991. All 10-year members of the BBWAA were eligible to vote.

Voters were instructed to cast votes for up to 10 candidates; any candidate receiving votes on at least 75% of the ballots would be honored with induction to the Hall. The ballot consisted of 30 players; 473 ballots were cast, with 353 votes required for election. A total of 2,515 individual votes were cast, an average of 5.32 per ballot—breaking the record low of 5.72 votes per ballot set the previous election (the election of 2012 would break 1997's record, with an average of 5.1 names per ballot). Those candidates receiving less than 5% of the vote (24 votes) will not appear on future BBWAA ballots, but may eventually be considered by the Veterans Committee.

Candidates who were eligible for the first time are indicated here with a dagger (†). The one candidate who received at least 75% of the vote and was elected is indicated in bold italics; candidates who have since been selected in subsequent elections are indicated in italics. The ten candidates who received less than 5% of the vote, thus becoming ineligible for future BBWAA consideration, are indicated with an asterisk (*).

Dick Allen and Joe Torre were on the ballot for the 15th and final time.

The newly-eligible candidates included 20 All-Stars, including twelve who were not on the ballot, representing a total of 39 All-Star selections. The only candidate elected to at least five All-Star Games was Dave Parker, who was selected a total of seven times. Parker was also the only MVP, winning the award once. The field also included one Cy Young Award-winner (Mike Scott) and one Rookie of the Year (Ron Kittle).

Players eligible for the first time who were not included on the ballot were: Marty Barrett, Tony Bernazard, Oil Can Boyd, Greg Brock, Carmen Castillo, Jim Clancy, Steve Crawford, Warren Cromartie, Scott Garrelts, Ron Hassey, Andy Hawkins, Mike Heath, Danny Heep, Tom Herr, Ron Kittle, Mike LaCoss, Dave LaPoint, Vance Law, Rick Mahler, Mike Marshall, Andy McGaffigan, Lloyd Moseby, Pascual Pérez, Dan Petry, Dan Schatzeder, John Shelby, Eric Show, Max Venable, Ed Whitson, Ernie Whitt, and Mookie Wilson.

The Veterans Committee 

The Veterans Committee met in closed sessions to elect as many as two executives, managers, umpires, and older major league players—the categories considered in all its meetings since 1953.
By an arrangement since 1995 it separately considered candidates from the Negro leagues and from the 19th century with authority to select one from each of those two special ballots.

The committee elected three people, one fewer than permitted:
second baseman Nellie Fox from the 1950s, manager Tommy Lasorda from the 1970s, and shortstop Willie Wells from the Negro leagues.

J. G. Taylor Spink Award 
Charley Feeney
received the J. G. Taylor Spink Award honoring a baseball writer.
(The award was voted at the December 1996 meeting of the BBWAA, dated 1996, and conferred in the summer 1997 ceremonies.)

Ford C. Frick Award 
Jimmy Dudley
received the Ford C. Frick Award honoring a baseball broadcaster.

References

External links
 1997 Election at www.baseballhalloffame.org.

Baseball Hall of Fame balloting
Hall of Fame balloting